Phlebonema is a fungal genus in the family Agaricaceae. It is a monotypic genus, containing the single species Phlebonema chrysotingens, described by Roger Heim in 1929 from Madagascar. According to the Dictionary of the Fungi (10th edition, 2008), the placement of this little-known genus in the Agaricaceae is uncertain.

See also
 List of Agaricaceae genera
 List of Agaricales genera

References

Agaricaceae
Fungi of Africa
Monotypic Agaricales genera